Risto Meronen (born 17 August 1945) is a Finnish boxer. He competed in the men's featherweight event at the 1968 Summer Olympics. At the 1968 Summer Olympics, he lost to Valery Plotnikov of the Soviet Union.

References

1945 births
Living people
Finnish male boxers
Olympic boxers of Finland
Boxers at the 1968 Summer Olympics
Sportspeople from Vantaa
Featherweight boxers